The 2001 Furman Paladins football team represented the Furman University as a member of the Southern Conference (SoCon) during the 2001 NCAA Division I-AA football season. Led by Bobby Johnson in his eighth and final year as head coach, the Paladins compiled an overall record of 12–3 with a mark of 7–1 in conference play, sharing the SoCon title with Georgia Southern. Furman advanced to the NCAA Division I-AA Football Championship playoffs, where they beat Western Kentucky in the first round, Lehigh in the quarterfinals, and Georgia Southern in the semifinals before losing to Montana in the NCAA Division I-AA Championship Game.

Schedule

References

Furman
Furman Paladins football seasons
Southern Conference football champion seasons
Furman Paladins football